The Master is an album by saxophonist Stan Getz which was recorded in 1975 but not released on the Columbia label until 1982.

Reception

The Allmusic review by Scott Yanow stated "More straightahead than Getz's other Columbia albums of the period, this set finds him really pushing himself".

Track listing
 "Summer Night" (Al Dubin, Harry Warren) - 9:59
 "Raven's Wood" (Ralph Towner) - 10:54
 "Lover Man (Oh, Where Can You Be?)" (Jimmy Davis, Ram Ramirez, James Sherman) - 9:25
 "Invitation" (Bronisław Kaper, Paul Francis Webster) - 10:34

Personnel 
Stan Getz - tenor saxophone
Albert Dailey - piano
Clint Houston - bass
Billy Hart - drums

References 

1982 albums
Stan Getz albums
Columbia Records albums